Bernard Coyne (1854–17 July 1926) was an Irish Roman Catholic clergyman who served as the Bishop of Elphin from 1913 to 1926, being consecrated 30 March 1913.

Coyne was born at Sandfield House, Roscommon, in 1854, and started his education at Summerhill College, then later studied for the priesthood at Maynooth College where he was a classmate of the future Cardinal O'Donnell.

References

1854 births
1926 deaths
Alumni of St Patrick's College, Maynooth
Roman Catholic bishops of Elphin